Letestudoxa is a genus of flowering plants belonging to the family Annonaceae.

Its native range is western Central Tropical Africa. It is found in Cabinda (region in Angola), Cameroon, Congo and Gabon.

The genus name of Letestudoxa is in honour of Georges Marie Patrice Charles Le Testu (1877–1967), a French colonial administrator in tropical Africa and was later at a botanical garden in Caen. 
It was first described and published in Bull. Mus. Natl. Hist. Nat. Vol.26 on page 654 in 1920.

Known species
According to Kew:
Letestudoxa bella 
Letestudoxa glabrifolia 
Letestudoxa lanuginosa

References

Annonaceae
Annonaceae genera
Plants described in 1920
Flora of Cabinda Province
Flora of Cameroon
Flora of the Republic of the Congo
Flora of Gabon